Phosphoglycerate kinase 1, pseudogene 2 is a protein that in humans is encoded by the PGK1P2 gene.

References